Bodajk is a town in Fejér county, Hungary. Since July 1, 2008, Bodajk is a town.

References

External links

  in Hungarian, English, German and Polish

Populated places in Fejér County